Robert Nemeth (5 June 1958 – 15 December 2015) was an Austrian middle- and long-distance runner. He represented his country in the 1500 metres at the 1980 Summer Olympics and the 1983 World Championships, reaching the semifinals on both occasions.

He won a total of 22 Austrian titles in various events. Some of his personal bests are still standing national records.

International competitions

1Did not finish in the semifinals

Personal bests
Outdoor
800 metres – 1:48.65 (Ebensee 1983)
1000 metres – 2:18.20 (Schwechat 1982) former NR
1500 metres – 3:35.8 (Rieti 1981)
One mile – 3:52.42 (Rieti 1981) NR
2000 metres – 4:59.56 (Klagenfurt 1984) NR
3000 metres – 7:44.08 (Berlin 1984)
5000 metres – 13:35.90 (Koblenz 1984)
10,000 metres – 29:01.20 (Mistelbach 1982)
3000 metres steeplechase – 8:42.98 (Götzis 1981)
Indoor
800 metres – 1:49.4 (Vienna 1981)
1500 metres – 3:38.50 (Vienna 1985) NR
One mile – 3:57.4 (San Diego 1982)
3000 metres – 7:48.01 (Budapest 1984)

References

All-Athletics profile
ÖLV profile

1958 births
2015 deaths
People from Hofors Municipality
Austrian male middle-distance runners
Athletes (track and field) at the 1980 Summer Olympics
Olympic athletes of Austria
World Athletics Championships athletes for Austria